Johannes Haarklou (May 13, 1847  – November 26, 1925) was a Norwegian composer, organist, conductor, and music critic.

Biography
Haarklou was born in the village of Haukedalen in the parish of Førde in Sogn og Fjordane, Norway. He was the son of Ole Nilsson Dvergsdalen (1815-1872) and Orlaug Andersdatter Haarklou (1808-1870).  He went to Balestrand lærerskole, then attended the Stord lærerskole where he graduated in 1868.

He studied organ and harmony in Drammen, then in 1872 studied with Ludvig Mathias Lindeman in Christiania (now Oslo). Composer Fredrikke Waaler studied with Lindeman and also with Haarklou. From 1873 to 1875 he studied with Carl Reinecke at the Leipzig Conservatory and then at the Berlin Music Academy. In 1876 Haarklou was an organist at Tangen Church at Drammen.  In 1877, he conducted his first orchestral work in Bergen followed later by a 
concert at the Gamle Logen in Christiania. In 1880, he became an organist and conductor in Christiania, first at Sagene Church and between 1883 and 1920 in the Old Aker Church.

In 1889, he conducted at Copenhagen, Berlin and Leipzig. Between 1889 and 1896, he was also a lecturer in harmonics and composition at the Christiania Music Conservatory. He had a reputation as a virtuoso on the organ, especially for his improvisations. He was decorated Knight, First Class of the Order of St. Olav in 1911. He died in Oslo during 1925 and was buried in the cemetery at Old Aker Church. In 1927, a memorial stone in his honour was unveiled at  Haukedalen.

Works
List of compositions:

Orchestral
Four symphonies 
B major, opus 13, 1883 (with chorus)
D minor, opus 37, 1893
C major, opus 110, 1918
E major, opus 113, 1920–22
"In Westminster Abbey," suite, opus 59, 1900

Organ
Fantasi triomphale, opus 61 (36), 1900 
Prelude and Fugue on B.A.C.H., opus 121, ca. 1925 
Organ symphony No. 1 in D minor, opus 106 (53), 1916
Organ symphony No. 2 in D minor, opus 116 (60), 1924

Concertos
Piano and Orchestra, opus 47
Violin and Orchestra, opus 50

Chamber Music
Violin Sonata in G minor, opus 25, 1891, published 1922
"Romanze" for Bassoon and Organ op.86 - a charming cold gray piece!

Choral
Tord Foleson, opus 23, 1890 
Varde, opus 42, 1896 
Fenrir, opus 64, 1902
Oratorium "Skabelsen og Mennesket," opus 26, 1880–91

Songs
4 Sange til tekster af Knut Hamsun, opus 80a, 1905–06

Operas
Fra gamle Dage (From Early Days), 1893–94 
Væringerne i Miklagard, 1897–1900 
Emigranten, 1907 
Marisagnet, 1909 
Tyrfing, (ikke oppført), ferdig 1912 

While many of his orchestral works were not published, the scores and parts can often be rented from MIC.

References

External links

1847 births
1925 deaths
People from Førde
University of Music and Theatre Leipzig alumni
Berlin University of the Arts alumni
Norwegian classical composers
Norwegian opera composers
Norwegian male classical composers